The 2021 F1600 Championship Series season is the eleventh season of the F1600 Championship Series. The season commences on April 1 at Carolina Motorsports Park, and ends on October 17 at Pittsburgh International Race Complex.

Last year's champion, Simon Sikes, moved up to the U.S. F2000 National Championship on the Road to Indy ladder.

The season was won by Nicholas d'Orlando who won twelve out of the twenty-four races for Team Pelfrey.

Drivers and teams

(M) indicates Masters Class driver

Schedule

Results

Driver Standings

See also
F1600 Championship Series

References

F1600 Championship Series seasons
F1600